Williams is an unincorporated community and census-designated place in Spice Valley Township, Lawrence County, Indiana, United States. As of the 2010 census, the population was 286.

Williams is situated on the East Fork of the White River. Williams is home to Williams Dam, a hydroelectric dam that once powered the electricity for stone industries across southern Indiana, especially in nearby Bedford and Bloomington.

History
The Williams post office was established in 1876. Byrd E. Williams was an early postmaster. Williams was platted in 1889. From 1910 to 1911, Williams Dam was being built on the East Fork of the White River. It was finally opened in 1913, giving electricity to stone industries in the region. The dam did this for almost four decades until being decommissioned in the 1950s. Almost 60 years later, Free Flow Power Corp., a startup company from Boston, looked into recommissioning the dam, giving the area a renewable energy power. The corporation planned to spend over $12 million by installing turbines on the plant. That plan was abandoned in 2018.

Geography
The census-designated place contains the town center of Williams along Indiana State Road 450, just north of the East Fork of the White River, but includes rural land to the north, east, and west. The CDP extends east to Crooked Creek, west to Dillman Road, and north to a high-tension power line.

Williams Bridge
The Williams Bridge, also known as the Lawrence County Bridge, was the longest double-span covered bridge open to traffic in Indiana. Built in 1884 by Joseph J. Daniels, the bridge receives its name from the nearby town, which was named in honor of early settler Isaac Williams. Though no historical marker is present, the Williams Bridge was added to the National Register of Historic Places in 1981 and is listed as #14-47-02 in the 1989 World Guide.

The Williams Bridge was totally refurbished in 2013 but has remained closed to vehicular traffic since around September 20, 2010.

Demographics

References

Census-designated places in Lawrence County, Indiana
Census-designated places in Indiana